Alexander John may refer to:

 Prince Alexander John of Wales (1871–1871), son of King Edward VII and Queen Alexandra
 Alexander John (athlete) (born 1986), German track and field athlete
 Alexander St John (died 1657), English politician
 Aleksander John, alias of Slovenian-Yugoslavian musician Aleksander Mežek (born 1948)

See also
 John Alexander (disambiguation)